Vermilion Parish is a parish located in the U.S. state of Louisiana, created in 1844. The parish seat is Abbeville. Vermilion Parish is part of the Lafayette metropolitan statistical area, and located in southern Acadiana. At the 2020 U.S. census, the population was 57,359. 

In the past several decades, much of the southern portion of the parish has been swept away by water erosion, especially after Hurricane Katrina and Hurricane Rita in 2005.

History
Indigenous peoples lived in the area for thousands of years, from different cultures.  By historic times, the Chitimacha and Atakapa inhabited the area and were the American Indians  encountered by Spanish and French explorers and settlers. The tribes' numbers were drastically reduced as a result of exposure to European diseases.

French, Spanish, enslaved Africans, and French-Canadians from Acadia expelled after the Seven Years' War won by Great Britain, had all entered the area by the end of the 18th century.  As the population became mostly Cajun, the primary language was French for years.  In the mid- to late 19th century, they were joined by European Americans; immigrants from Italy, recruited to work on the plantations, as well as Jewish immigrants from Germany and eastern Europe, who tended to settle in towns and become merchants.

Geography

It is the fifth-largest parish in Louisiana by total area. The Gulf of Mexico is located to the south of the parish.

Major highways
  U.S. Highway 167
  Louisiana Highway 13
  Louisiana Highway 14
  Louisiana Highway 82
  Louisiana Highway 89
  Louisiana Highway 91
  Louisiana Highway 92
  Louisiana Highway 330
  Louisiana Highway 331
  Louisiana Highway 338
  Louisiana Highway 339
  Louisiana Highway 343

Adjacent parishes
 Acadia Parish (north)
 Lafayette Parish (northeast)
 Iberia Parish (east)
 Cameron Parish (west)
 Jefferson Davis Parish (northwest)

Communities

Cities 
 Abbeville (parish seat and largest municipality)
 Kaplan

Towns 
 Delcambre (part)
 Erath
 Gueydan
Maurice

Unincorporated communities 

 Boston
 Camille
 Charogne
 Forked Island
 Grosse Isle
 Henry
 Leblanc
 Leroy
 Indian Bayou
 Intracoastal City
 Meaux
 Pecan Island
 Perry

Demographics

Home to a number of Cajun peoples, at the 2000 U.S. census, there were 53,807 people, 19,832 households, and 14,457 families residing in the parish. The population density was 46 people per square mile (18/km2). At the 2019 American Community Survey, there were 59,865 people living in the parish, up from 57,999 at the 2010 U.S. census. By the 2020 United States census, there were 57,359 people, 22,086 households, and 15,143 families residing in the parish.

In 2000, were 22,461 housing units at an average density of 19 per square mile (7/km2). The racial makeup of the parish was 82.68% White, 14.17% Black or African American, 0.30% Native American, 1.82% Asian, 0.01% Pacific Islander, 0.26% from other races, and 0.76% from two or more races; 1.38% of the population were Hispanic or Latin American of any race; 24.89% reported speaking French or Cajun French at home, while 1.64% speak Vietnamese and 1.02% Spanish. In 2019, the racial and ethnic makeup was 81.4% non-Hispanic white, 14.5% Black and African American, 0.5% Native American, 2.0% Asian, 0.1% Pacific Islander, 0.4% some other race, and 1.1% from two or more races. An estimated 3.5% of the population were Hispanic and Latin American of any race.

At the 2000 U.S. census, there were 19,832 households, out of which 37.10% had children under the age of 18 living with them, 55.50% were married couples living together, 13.00% had a female householder with no husband present, and 27.10% were non-families. 23.10% of all households were made up of individuals, and 10.90% had someone living alone who was 65 years of age or older.  The average household size was 2.67 and the average family size was 3.16. The 2019 American Community Survey determined there were 22,086 households and 26,586 housing units; there was a home-ownership rate of 77% and the median housing value was $122,200. The median gross rent from 2015 to 2019 was $685.

In 2019, the median income for a household in the parish was $51,945; males had a median income of $53,658 versus $33,327 for females. About 21.3% of the children under 18 lived at or below the poverty line, and 17.6% of the total population was below the poverty line. The median income for a household in the parish was $29,500, and the median income for a family was $36,093 in 2000. Males had a median income of $31,044 versus $18,710 for females. The per capita income for the parish was $14,201. About 17.40% of families and 22.10% of the population were below the poverty line, including 30.00% of those under age 18 and 21.40% of those age 65 or over.

Education
Vermilion Parish School Board operates most public schools in the parish. Schools serving Delcambre are located in Vermilion Parish but are operated by the Iberia Parish School System.

Schools
Public Schools that are run by the Vermilion Parish School Board include:
 Cecil Picard Elementary (Grades PK-5) (Maurice)
 Dozier Elementary (Grades PK-5) (Erath)
 Eaton Park Elementary (Grades PK-2) (Abbeville)
 Forked Island - E. Broussard Elementary (Grades PK-8) (Abbeville)
 Indian Bayou Elementary (Grades PK-5) (Rayne)
 James A. Herod Elementary (Grades 3–5) (Abbeville)
 Jesse Owens Elementary (Grades PK-5) (Gueydan)
 Kaplan Elementary (Grades PK-4) (Kaplan)
 Leblanc Elementary (Grades PK-5) (Abbeville)
 Meaux Elementary (Grades PK-5) (Abbeville)
 Seventh Ward Elementary (Grades PK-5) (Abbeville)
 Erath Middle (Grades 6–8) (Erath)
 J. H. Williams Middle (Grades 6–8) (Abbeville)
 North Vermilion Middle (Grades 6–8) (Maurice)
 Rene A. Rost Middle (Grades 5–8) (Kaplan)
 Abbeville High (Grades 9-12) (Abbeville)
 Erath High School (Grades 9-12) (Erath)
 Gueydan High (Grades 6-12) (Gueydan)
 Kaplan High (Grades 9-12) (Kaplan)
 North Vermilion High (Grades 9-12) (Maurice)

Vermilion Parish is also served by the Diocese of Lafayette with three schools:
 Maltrait Memorial School (Grades PK-8) (Kaplan)
 Mt. Carmel Catholic School (Grades PK-8) (Abbeville)
 Vermilion Catholic High School (Grades 9-12) (Abbeville)

Additionally, Vermilion Parish is served by two unaffiliated private schools:
 Harvest Time Christian Academy (Grades PK-12) (Abbeville)
 Lighthouse Christian High School (Grades 9-12) (Abbeville)

Vermilion Parish is served by one institution of higher education:
 South Louisiana Community College service area, Gulf Area Campus (Abbeville)

Politics

See also

 National Register of Historic Places listings in Vermilion Parish, Louisiana

References

External links
 Heinrich, P. V., 2006, White Lake 30 x 60 minute geologic quadrangle. Louisiana Geological Survey, Baton Rouge, Louisiana.
 Heinrich, P. V., J. Snead, and R. P. McCulloh, 2003, Crowley 30 x 60 minute geologic quadrangle. Louisiana Geological Survey, Baton Rouge, Louisiana.
 
 Vermilion Historical Society
 Vermilion Parish Sheriff's Office

 
Louisiana parishes
Parishes in Acadiana
Acadiana
1844 establishments in Louisiana
Populated places established in 1844
Articles containing video clips